Magazine Enterprises was an American comic book company lasting from 1943 to 1958, which published primarily Western, humor, crime, adventure, and children's comics, with virtually no superheroes. It was founded by Vin Sullivan, an editor at Columbia Comics and before that the editor at National Allied Publications, the future DC Comics.

Magazine Enterprises' characters include the jungle goddess Cave Girl, drawn by Bob Powell, and Ghost Rider, a horror fiction-themed Western avenger created by writer Ray Krank and artist Dick Ayers in 1949; after the trademark lapsed, Ayers and others adapted it as Marvel Comics' non-horror but otherwise near-identical Western character Ghost Rider in 1967.

Magazine Enterprises should not be confused with the same-name Scottish company that published science fiction magazines from at least 1946 to 1960.

Publication history

In late 1947, Superman creators Jerry Siegel and Joe Shuster collaborated once again with editor Vin Sullivan, who had worked with the writer-artist team during their nascent days freelancing for National Allied Publications, the future DC Comics. The duo had decamped to Magazine Enterprises after leaving National Allied (by then called National Comics) and suing to regain the rights to Superman and their later creation, Superboy. Siegel and Shuster brought most of their studio's artists with them, except for 1950s Superman penciler Wayne Boring, and created the new character Funnyman, a slapstick-comedian hero. Both as a comic book and as a comic strip, however, the character failed to find an audience.

Magazine Enterprises' best-known character may be Ghost Rider, a horror-themed Western avenger created by writer Ray Krank and artist Dick Ayers in 1949. After the trademark lapsed, Ayers and others adapted it as Marvel Comics' non-horror but otherwise near-identical Western character Ghost Rider in 1967.

The company's two superhero characters were the Avenger, created by writer Gardner Fox and artist Dick Ayers in The Avenger #1 (March 1955), with  Bob Powell drawing the character's three subsequent issues and all four covers; and the aptly named Strong Man, an unmasked, super-strong hero in a jungle-print circus strongman outfit. The Avenger was one of the very few traditional, costumed superheroes created during the period before superheroes' revival in what historians and fans call the Silver Age of Comics, beginning 1956.

Other original characters include the jungle goddess Cave Girl, drawn by Bob Powell, and the talking animal canine hero Hot Dog, created by cartoonist George Crenshaw and unrelated to the later Archie Comics character of that name.

Among the company's publications were licensed film and TV comics featuring comedian Jimmy Durante; suave actor Dick Powell; and the CBS television series The Adventures of Robin Hood, starring Richard Greene. Additionally, Little Miss Sunbeam Comics starred the blond, pig-tailed mascot of Sunbeam Bread.

Since the copyright to Magazine Enterprises' comics do not appear to have been renewed, they evidently fell into the public domain in accordance with copyright laws at the time.  Beginning in the 1980s, AC Comics issued reprint titles of Magazine Enterprises material, along with those of other defunct publishers of that era. As well, AC revived the Avenger as a guest star in FemForce #19 (1989; no cover date), then creating a new series. Ghost Rider reprints appeared in 1999 with the character renamed the Haunted Horseman.

Titles by genre

Children's
Clubhouse Rascals
Ding Dong
The Pixies
Koko and Kola
Little Miss Sunbeam Comics
Mighty Atom (child superhero, not the anime character)
Mighty Atom and the Pixies
Muggsy Mouse (1951 and 1954 series)
Tom-Tom and Itchi the Monk
Tom-Tom, The Jungle Boy
Tick Tock Tales
Vacation Comics

Crime
Dick Powell a.k.a. Star Parade Presents Dick Powell
I'm A Cop
Kerry Drake Detective Cases
The Killers
Manhunt
Mysteries of Scotland Yard
Undercover Girl

Historical adventure
Robin Hood (1955–1957; see also Movie/TV, below)
Dan'l Boone

Humor
The Brain
Dogface Dooley
Dotty Dripple
Hot Dog
Jimmy Durante Comics

Jungle
Africa
Cave Girl
Thun'da

Misc. 
A-1 Comics
Rotating anthology sometimes used as an alternate title/issue number; for example,  Hot Dog #3 was also A-1 Comics #24; Danger is Their Business #11 (the only issue of that title published) was also A-1 Comics #50; Home Run #3 (the only issue of that title published) was also A-1 Comics #89; and Ghost Rider #1-14 was also A-1 #27, 29, 31, 34, 37, 44, 51, 57, 69, 71, 75, 80, 84 & 112.
Extra Comics

Movie/TV
The Adventures of Robin Hood (1957; see also Historical Adventure, above)
Keen Teens
Movie Thrillers
See also: Dick Powell (Crime), Jimmy Durante Comics (Humor), Tim Holt (Western)

Romance
Dream Book of Love
Dream Book of Romance
Romantic Picture Novellettes

Science fiction
Jet Powers
Major Inapak the Space Ace a.k.a. Space Ace

Sports
Pride of the Yankees

Superhero
The Avenger
Funnyman
Strong Man

War
The American Air Forces
United States Marines

Western
Badmen of the West! (1953–1954)
Best of the West (1951–1954)
Black Phantom (1954)
Bobby Benson's B-Bar-B Riders (1950–1953)
Cowboys 'N' Injuns/Cowboys and Indians (1946–1952)
Durango Kid (1949–1955)
Ghost Rider (1950–1954)
Great Western (1953–1954)
Guns of Fact and Fiction (1948)
Red Hawk (1953)
Red Mask (1954–1957)
Straight Arrow (1950–1956)
Straight Arrow's Fury (1954)
Tim Holt (1948–1954)
Trail Colt (1949)
White Indian (1953–1955)

References

External links

Comic book publishing companies of the United States
Defunct comics and manga publishing companies
Book publishing companies based in New York (state)
Publishing companies based in New York City
Publishing companies established in 1943
Publishing companies disestablished in 1958
1943 establishments in New York (state)
1958 disestablishments in New York (state)
American companies established in 1943